Seattle Queer Film Festival (formerly known as the Seattle Lesbian & Gay Film Festival) is an annual film festival in Seattle. The 25th Annual Seattle Queer Film Festival will take place October 14–24, 2021. It is the largest LGBTQ film festival in the Pacific Northwest, and its award-winning films receive national praise. At the festival each film is able to receive an award which is decided on by a jury. Kathleen Mullen (2020) is the interim executive director of Three Dollar Bill Cinema, the organization that produces the Seattle Queer Film Festival. Kathleen Mullen (2014–2015 and 2018–2021) is the Festival Director of the Seattle Queer Film Festival in charge of all festival programming and operations.

The festival is produced by Three Dollar Bill Cinema, a nonprofit organization which promotes queer cinema. Their mission is to provide films by, for, and about lesbian, gay, bisexual, and transgender people. The festival is a place where the filmmakers can have contact and interact with their audiences and fellow filmmakers. Films are screened in cinemas around Seattle including AMC Pacific Place, SIFF Cinema Egyptian, and Northwest Film Forum. There are also after parties at local spots like Pony and Queer/Bar following the showings.

References

External links

 https://www.threedollarbillcinema.org/
 https://www.threedollarbillcinema.org/seaqueerfilmfest

Film festivals established in 1996
Festivals in Seattle
Film festivals in Washington (state)
LGBT events in Washington (state)
LGBT film festivals in the United States
1995 establishments in Washington (state)
LGBT culture in Seattle